Cameron Gatlin Dunbar (born October 22, 2002) is an American professional soccer player who plays for Minnesota United in Major League Soccer.

Career
Dunbar spent time with the academy sides for Albion SC and LA Galaxy, before signing as a homegrown player with MLS side LA Galaxy on February 20, 2020. He made his professional debut on March 8, 2020 for LA Galaxy's USL Championship side, starting and scoring in a 5–1 win over Rio Grande Valley FC. Dunbar made his Major League Soccer debut in the MLS is Back tournament against the Portland Timbers. On November 7, 2022 Minnesota United FC announced they had acquired Dunbar as a homegrown player in exchange for a third round pick in the 2023 MLS SuperDraft and $75,000 General Allocation Money.

References

External links
 
 USSF Development Academy bio 
 LA Galaxy bio

2002 births
Living people
American soccer players
Association football forwards
Homegrown Players (MLS)
LA Galaxy II players
LA Galaxy players
Minnesota United FC players
Soccer players from California
USL Championship players
Major League Soccer players